Shahi Bagh is one of the oldest and largest gardens in Peshawar, Khyber Pakhtunkhwa Pakistan. It is a Mughal-era park located in the Peshawar city near the Arbab Niaz Stadium and has been a hub for political meetings, literary and social gatherings in the city.

History 

Shahi Bagh is located in Faqirabad, Peshawar. The literal meaning of "Shahi Bagh" in local languages is "The Royal Park". The total area of the park is almost 100 acres and was built during the time of the Mughals. It holds a significant recreational and historical value for the city and its residents. According to the government, the garden is a national heritage site and public property.

Shahi Bagh is a very popular place among students. Students used to go for recreational activities in the park and even study in the olden days. Sant Kirpal Singh, who used to study in Edwardes Church Mission High School (Edwardes College) Peshawar, writes that he used to take his book and study in the Shahi Bagh.

Over the years, due to wear and tear and neglect by various governments, the condition of Shahi Bagh had deteriorated. So, in August 2009, then ANP led Government of Khyber Pakhtunkhwa, launched the beautification and renovation of Shahi Bagh with the financial support of USAID, The project was formally inaugurated on by then Senior Minister of Pukhtunkhwa province Bashir Ahmed Bilour and the Senior Deputy Mission Director for the U.S. Agency for International Development (USAID) Denise Herbol.

In 2012, through applications from social activists and citizens of Peshawar, the Peshawar High Court Chief Justice had taken notice of the park's condition and government of the province was ordered to remove all the newly illegally built structures and buildings in the garden to restore it to its original old shape.

Buildings and recreational sites 
Shahi Bagh currently houses many buildings and recreational sites:

 Arbab Naiz Cricket Stadium
 Government College Peshawar
 Municipal Inter College For Girls, Peshawar
 Pakistan Tennis Club Peshawar
 Parda Bagh and Wedding Hall
 Peshawar Gymkhana Cricket Ground
 Shalimar Garden
 Tehmas Khan Football Stadium Peshawar

See also 
 Wazir Bagh Peshawar
 Army Stadium Peshawar
 Jinnah Park Peshawar

References 

Peshawar
Tourist attractions in Peshawar
Mughal gardens in Pakistan
Parks in Pakistan
Parks in Khyber Pakhtunkhwa